The Goulbi de Maradi is a river in south central Niger and north central Nigeria. Though important for agriculture and pastoralism, and flowing through the Niger cities of Maradi, Guidan Roumdji, and Madarounfa, the Goulbi de Maradi is a seasonal river and flows only during the rainy season.

References

Goulbi De Maradi river readings at Madarounfa, 1954–1977, UNESCO.
Suttie, J.M., The agro-pastoral potential of the Goulbi de Maradi and the El Fadama River Basins (Niger).  FAO - AGO;ESP. Maradi (Niger), Jan 1985
Schembri, H., Measurement of the pressure and conductivity of the waters of the phreatic system of the upper cretaceous and quaternary water tables in the Goulbi de Maradi and El Fadama basins.   FAO - AGO;ESP. Maradi (Niger), Jan 1985

Rivers of Nigeria
Rivers of Niger
Rima River
International rivers of Africa